Mario Leitgeb (born 30 June 1988) is an Austrian professional footballer who plays as a midfielder for Austrian Bundesliga club Wolfsberger AC. He has one appearance for the Austrian under-21 team.

Club career

Early career
Leitgeb started his career in the Styrian capital, playing for Sturm Graz. He played in the club's academy until 2006, where he was promoted to the reserve team. Between 2006 and 2008, Leitgeb played 25 matches for the reserves, scoring one goal. In 2008, he was picked up by SC Austria Lustenau from the second division. Leitgeb made his debut in the second division on 11 July 2008, in a 2–0 away loss to SV Grödig. In the second round of the regular season he made an own goal. During his time in Lustenau, he picked up 89 league appearances and made 10 additional appearances in the Austrian Cup. In the 36th minute of his first cup appearance, a match against FC Wels on 14 August 2008, he scored his first goal for the club. Austria Lustenau, however, lost 5–4 in a penalty shootout.

In the January transfer window of the 2011–12 season, Leitgeb was signed by Grazer AK, but left by mutual consent after only six months after the club failed to reach promomotion to the Austrian Bundesliga. Instead, he continued his career with SV Grödig, where he played 63 league matches in two seasons. On 12 June 2014, Leitgeb signed a three-year contract with Austria Wien for an undisclosed fee. 

After initially having signed a precontract with former club Sturm Graz in January 2016, Leitgeb joined Swiss club FC St. Gallen on a six-month contract.

Wolfsberger AC
In January 2017 Leitgeb returned to Austria, signing with Bundesliga-side Wolfsberger AC on a one-and-a-half year deal. He signed a two-year contract extension with the club on 29 March 2019. On 19 September 2019, Leitgeb made his European debut in a UEFA Europa League group stage away match against German club Borussia Mönchengladbach. In what was described as a "miracle", he scored two headers against a passive Mönchengladbach-defense and thereby became a vital part in Wolfsberger's 4–0 thrashing.

References

External links
 

Austrian footballers
Austria youth international footballers
Austrian Football Bundesliga players
SV Grödig players
1988 births
Living people
SC Austria Lustenau players
Grazer AK players
FK Austria Wien players
FC St. Gallen players
Wolfsberger AC players
Association football midfielders
Austrian expatriate footballers
Expatriate footballers in Switzerland
Austrian expatriate sportspeople in Switzerland
Swiss Super League players
Footballers from Graz